Lucius Furius Camillus was a Roman politician and general who served as consul of the Roman Republic in 338 BC and in 325 BC.  During his 338 BC consulship, he, along with Gaius Maenius, commanded Rome's legions during the Battle of Pedum, during which Camillus engaged forces from the cities of Tibur and Praeneste.  Afterwards, Maenius and he were awarded with a triumph and equestrian statues in the Roman Forum.  During his second consulship in 325 BC, he was assigned the duty of dealing with the Samnites as a part of the Second Samnite War.  However, he fell ill and had to relinquish his command, prompting the appointment of Lucius Papirius Cursor as dictator.

References 

4th-century BC Roman consuls
Furii